1182 Ilona, provisional designation , is a stony asteroid from the inner regions of the asteroid belt, approximately 14 kilometers in diameter. It was discovered by German astronomer Karl Reinmuth at the Heidelberg Observatory on 3 March 1927, and later named Ilona. Any reference to its name is unknown.

Classification and orbit 

Ilona orbits the Sun in the inner main-belt at a distance of 2.0–2.5 AU once every 3 years and 5 months (1,241 days). Its orbit has an eccentricity of 0.12 and an inclination of 9° with respect to the ecliptic. The body's observation arc, however, begins at Heidelberg one night after its official discovery observation.

Naming 

Any reference to a person or occurrence of this minor planet's name is unknown. The name was suggested by German astronomer Gustav Stracke.

Unknown meaning 

Among the many thousands of named minor planets, Ilona is one of 120 asteroids, for which no official naming citation has been published.

Physical characteristics 

Ilona is an assumed stony S-type asteroid.

Rotation period and shape 

Three rotational lightcurve of Ilona were obtained from photometric observations. Lightcurve analysis gave a rotation period of 29.8 hours (including an alternative period solution 14.938 hours, or half the period) with a brightness variation of 0.98 to 1.20 magnitude. A high brightness amplitude typically indicates that the body has a non-spheroidal shape.

Diameter and albedo 

According to the surveys carried out by the Infrared Astronomical Satellite IRAS, the Japanese Akari satellite, and NASA's Wide-field Infrared Survey Explorer with its subsequent NEOWISE mission, Ilona measures between 12.67 and 17.88 kilometers in diameter and its surface has an albedo between 0.175 and 0.2957. The Collaborative Asteroid Lightcurve Link derives an albedo of 0.2039 and calculates a diameter of 14.09 kilometers based on an absolute magnitude of 11.6.

References

External links 
 Asteroid Lightcurve Database (LCDB), query form (info )
 Dictionary of Minor Planet Names, Google books
 Asteroids and comets rotation curves, CdR – Observatoire de Genève, Raoul Behrend
 Discovery Circumstances: Numbered Minor Planets (1)-(5000) – Minor Planet Center
 
 

001182
Discoveries by Karl Wilhelm Reinmuth
Named minor planets
19270303